Hyalea dividalis is a moth in the family Crambidae. It was described by Carl Geyer in 1832. It is found in Brazil.

References

Moths described in 1832
Pyraustinae